The Ministry of Forests and Environment is a governmental body of Nepal responsible for the conservation of forests and managing the environment in the country. Its main purposes are to enhance sustainable growth of the forest and water sectors and to manage the biodiversity, flora and fauna and also to increase the development of forest related enterprises in order to combat poverty throughout the rural areas of Nepal.

History
Throughout its history, the ministry had several different names and portfolios. Under the Koirala cabinet and the first Oli cabinet, it was the Ministry of Forests. In 2018, under the second Oli cabinet, the portfolio of the ministry was changed from Ministry of Forests and Soil Conservation to Ministry of Forests and Environment.

Organisational structure
Two departments serve under the ministry to facilitate and implement its work:
Department of National Parks and Wildlife Conservation
Department of Forests

Former Ministers of Forests and Environment
This is a list of former Ministers of Forests and Soil Conservation since the Nepalese Constituent Assembly election in 2013:

References

Forests and Soil Conservation
Nepal
Environmental agencies in Nepal